The Invasion of the Spacepeckers is the debut album by VideoKids released in 1984. It was released on vinyl and tape in 1984, and unofficial on CD releases from 1995. There are seven versions of the album with one containing nine bonus remixes.

There was also two music videos released for Woodpeckers from Space, and Do the Rap, all of which feature Peter, Bianica, and Tico, the band's Looney Tunes-esque cartoon mascot.

Track listing

Official tracks
Side A
"Do the Rap" (4:11)
"Cartooney Toons" (incl. "Happy Birthday") (4:20)
"La Bamba" (4:15)
"I'm a Rock n' Roll Pecker" (2:05)
"Communication Outerspace" (3:06)

Side B
"Woodpeckers from Space" (5:54)
"Give Me That Banana" (4:04)
"Do You Like Surfing?" (3:17)
"Sky Rider" (3:13)

Bonus remixes
"Woodpeckers from Space" (1984 12" Version)
 "Rap and Sing-Along" (1984 12" Version B-side)
 "Do the Rap" (1985 12" Version)
 "Happy Birthday" / "Sky Rider" (1985 B-side)
 "Woodpeckers from Space" (1986 7" Version)
 "Woodpeckers from Space" (1986 12" Version)
 "Woodpeckers from Space" (1989 Video 'House' Kids Version)
 "Woodpeckers from Space" (1994 Radio Version)
 "Woodpeckers from Space" (1994 Extended Mix)
"Satellite"
"Woodpeckers from Space" (House Version)

References

1984 debut albums
VideoKids albums